New Mills station may be the following places:
New Mills Central railway station
New Mills Newtown railway station
New Mills bus station